Suat Türker (10 March 1976 – 12 February 2023) was a Turkish-German professional footballer who played as a striker.

Career
Born in Bayburt, Turkey, Türker began his professional career with Istanbulspor, appearing in 38 Süper Lig matches over two seasons.

Türker played for Kickers Offenbach from 2003 to 2008 and became a fan favourite there. He played for SC Freiburg during the first half of the 2008–09 season. In January 2009 he returned to Kickers Offenbach.

Death
On 12 February 2023, Türker's former club Kickers Offenbach announced that he had died "unexpectedly" that day, at the age of 46.

References

External links
 
 

1976 births
2023 deaths
People from Bayburt
Turkish emigrants to Germany
Naturalized citizens of Germany
German people of Turkish descent
Turkish footballers
German footballers
Association football forwards
2. Bundesliga players
3. Liga players
Süper Lig players
VfB Stuttgart II players
İstanbulspor footballers
TSF Ditzingen players
FC Bayern Munich II players
TSG 1899 Hoffenheim players
BSC Young Boys players
Borussia Neunkirchen players
Kickers Offenbach players
SC Freiburg players
SV Wehen Wiesbaden players
Turkish expatriate footballers
German expatriate footballers
Expatriate footballers in Switzerland
Turkish expatriate sportspeople in Switzerland
German expatriate sportspeople in Switzerland